Copelatus darlingtoni is a species of diving beetle. It is part of the genus Copelatus in the subfamily Copelatinae of the family Dytiscidae. It was described by Young in 1942.

References

darlingtoni
Beetles described in 1942